Petar Nikolajević Moler (1775 – summer 1816), whose sobriquet "Moler" meant "the painter", was a Serbian revolutionary, participating in both the First and Second phases, serving as the Prime Minister from 1815 to 1816.

Biography
Moler was educated as a painter, known for his works in several monasteries in the pre-Uprising period, and thus earning his nickname, Moler (painter in Serbian). He was a nephew of Hadži-Ruvim, who was executed by the Dahije (renegade Janissaries) during the Slaughter of the knezes.

In the First Serbian Uprising, Moler distinguished himself in battle near the village of Jelenča. During the uprising, he painted the church built by Karađorđe in Topola. During the defense of Loznica in 1813, because of a lack of ink, Moler wrote a letter with his blood to the leaders of the uprising. After the failure of the uprising, Moler fled to the Austrian Empire, but returned to Serbia at the start of the Second Serbian Uprising.

He was President of the Serbian Government from 1815 to 1816. Moler and Bishop Melentije Simeonović Nikšić were among the first opposition leaders to Prince Miloš Obrenović, and as such were killed in 1816.

See also
List of prime ministers of Serbia
List of Serbian Revolutionaries

References

19th-century Serbian people
Serbian rebels
Serbian soldiers
Politicians from Valjevo
1775 births
1816 deaths
Military personnel from Valjevo
People of the First Serbian Uprising
People of the Second Serbian Uprising
Assassinated Serbian politicians
Assassinated revolutionaries